Birch Vale is a village in the High Peak district of Derbyshire, just outside the boundary of the Peak District National Park, between New Mills and Hayfield. Most of Birch Vale, including the attached hamlet of Thornsett, comes under the administration of New Mills Town Council, though the small part to the east of the former Grouse Inn public house is within the boundaries of Hayfield.

Amenities
 
There are no shops, but two surviving public houses: the Sycamore Inn and Printers Arms in Thornsett. Previously, there were three more pubs: the Vine Tavern has closed permanently, the Waltzing Weasel became a B&B in 2013 and the Grouse Inn closed in January 2020.

There is a primary school in Thornsett.

Transport
 

Until 1970, Birch Vale had a railway station on a branch line from New Mills Central to Hayfield, with through trains to Manchester Piccadilly. Today, the trackbed of the former railway line carries the Sett Valley Trail; the nearest railheads are the stations in New Mills — Central and Newtown — about two miles away. 

There are frequent bus services into New Mills, Hayfield, Glossop, Buxton and Stockport; routes are operated by High Peak Buses and Stagecoach Manchester.

Notable people
Birch Vale's most famous daughter is the TV presenter Tess Daly, who grew up there.

Factory fire 2009 
In the early evening of Friday 2 October 2009 a large explosion was heard by residents as the Stirling Lloyd factory on a local industrial estate caught fire. It took around 16–20 hours to bring the fire under control. Local residents were evacuated shortly after police arrived. New Mills Fire and Rescue Team were among the first on the scene.

References

External links

Villages in Derbyshire
Towns and villages of the Peak District
New Mills